Ecuador is divided into 24 provinces (singularprovincia). The provinces of Ecuador and their capitals are:

List

1 Population as per the census carried out on 2010-11-28

In addition, there were four areas that were non-delimited. These locations were:
 Las Golondrinas: In a referendum held on April 3, 2016, 56.9% of voters voted in favor of Las Golondrinas being incorporated into the Imbabura Province.
 La Manga del Cura: In a referendum held on September 27, 2015, 64.2% of the voters voted in favor of La Manga del Cura being incorporated into the Manabí Province.
 El Piedrero: incorporated into Guayas Province by the Presidential decree in 2017.
 Matilde Esther: incorporated into Guayas Province by the Presidential decree in 2017

Regions and planning areas
Regionalization, or zoning, is the union of two or more adjoining provinces in order to decentralize the administrative functions of the capital, Quito.
In Ecuador, there are seven regions, or zones, each shaped by the following provinces:
 Region 1 (42,126 km2, or 16,265 mi2): Esmeraldas, Carchi, Imbabura, and Sucumbios. Administrative city: Ibarra
 Region 2 (43,498 km2, or 16,795 mi2): Pichincha, Napo, and Orellana. Administrative city: Tena
 Region 3 (44,710 km2, or 17,263 mi2): Chimborazo, Tungurahua, Pastaza, and Cotopaxi. Administrative city: Riobamba
 Region 4 (22,257 km2, or 8,594 mi2): Manabí and Santo Domingo de los Tsachilas. Administrative city: Ciudad Alfaro
 Region 5 (38,420 km2, or 14,834 mi2): Santa Elena, Guayas, Los Ríos, Galápagos, and Bolívar. Administrative city: Milagro
 Region 6 (38,237 km2, or 14,763 mi2): Cañar, Azuay, and Morona Santiago. Administrative city: Cuenca
 Region 7 (27,571 km2, or 10,645 mi2): El Oro, Loja, and Zamora Chinchipe. Administrative city: Loja

Quito and Guayaquil are Metropolitan Districts. Galápagos, despite being included within Region 5, is also under a special unit.

See also
List of Ecuadorian provinces by Human Development Index
Cantons of Ecuador
ISO 3166-2:EC, ISO 3166-2 for codes.
 Leaders of Ecuador provinces

References

External links
 

 
Subdivisions of Ecuador
Ecuador, Provinces
Provinces, Ecuador
Ecuador geography-related lists